Ramaar Jackson, better known by his stage name Choo Jackson is an American hip hop recording artist, and producer. He is a Florida native from Vero Beach who later moved to Chambersburg, Pennsylvania. He worked at ID Labs studio in Pittsburgh, Pennsylvania where he was discovered by Mac Miller who signed him to his label. He has appeared, along with his song "Bikes", on MTV2's on Mac Miller and the Most Dope Family.

Career

2011–present: BFP 

Choo Jackson made his first appearance on Most Dope with Mac Miller remixing his Presh Muney song "Regular Guy". His debut release on Most Dope, "Beer Flavored Pizza", released on January 15, 2013. The project was mixed by DJ Clockwork and featured 6 songs self-produced by Choo along with guest production from Larry Fisherman and Brandun DeShay. In May, he appeared on Ustream to play a new song titled "Windows" as well as to pay respects to "the Based God", Lil B 
.

Discography 
This World (September 2012)
Beer Flavored Pizza (January 2013)
Broken Hearts Make Money (2015)
Anime (2015)
Choo Where U Goin? (2016)
Parade (2017)
Anime 2 (2019)
TrailerBoy (2020)
Flooded Mixtape (2020)
 Ghetto Beautiful Misery (2020)

References 

American hip hop musicians
Living people
Year of birth missing (living people)